Heroes of Comedy is a British television series, produced by Thames Television, and broadcast on Channel 4, which devotes each episode to a legend of British comedy. It was produced by John Fisher. Beginning in 1995, it followed a 2½ hour more general programme from 1992.

Episodes

Series one 

Contributions from Roy Hudd and Bob Monkhouse. An animatronic Miller was created for the programme and performed by David Barclay, Dave Chapman and Mike Quinn.

Series two

The first group subject, and the first where two of the performers covered (Spike Milligan and Harry Secombe) were alive at the time of broadcast.

Series three

This series examined dead performers.

Series four

All subjects in this series were living at the time of broadcast.

Series five 

This series examined living and dead performers.

Series six

Previously covered as part of the Goons episode. Aired three days after Milligan's death.

Series seven

External links
 .

1995 British television series debuts
2003 British television series endings
Channel 4 original programming
Television series by Fremantle (company)
Television shows produced by Thames Television